Palaephatus albiterminus is a moth of the  family Palaephatidae. It was described by Donald R. Davis in 1986. It is found in the wetter areas of the temperate, Valdivian forests of southern Argentina and Chile.

The length of the forewings is 6.8–10 mm for males and 9–10 mm for females. Adults have a white to fuscous head and thorax and dark fuscous forewings with a slender, pale yellowish white spot extending along most of the termen. They are on wing from September to February, possibly in multiple generations per year.

Etymology
The specific name is derived from Latin albus (meaning white) and terminus (meaning end or limit) and refers to the narrow white band on the termen.

References

Moths described in 1986
Palaephatidae
Taxa named by Donald R. Davis (entomologist)